Asenjan (also Romanized as Asenjān; also known as Asinjah, Asīnjān, and Espanjān) is a village in Sard-e Sahra Rural District of the Central District of Tabriz County, East Azerbaijan province, Iran. At the 2006 National Census, its population was 1,451 in 265 households. The following census in 2011 counted 1,633 people in 397 households. The latest census in 2016 showed a population of 1,745 people in 437 households; it was the largest village in its rural district.

References 

Tabriz County

Populated places in East Azerbaijan Province

Populated places in Tabriz County